Ro20-8552 is a benzodiazepine derivative with sedative and anxiolytic effects, which has been sold as a designer drug.

See also 
 Ro05-2904
 Ro05-4435
 Ro05-4082
 Ro07-4065
 Ro20-8065

References 

Designer drugs
GABAA receptor positive allosteric modulators
Benzodiazepines
Fluoroarenes
Chloroarenes